Report from Herrnburg is a production performed by a youth chorus that consisted of ten songs, each with a brief introductory commentary, written by the German dramatist Bertolt Brecht, and two fragments of film, given on a concert platform in the form of a report. The music for the production was composed by Paul Dessau. It was directed by Egon Monk at the Deutsches Theater in Berlin in August 1951. The Free German Youth chorus performed the piece as part of the World Festival of Democratic Youth; the production was awarded the National Prize, First Class.

Works cited
 Willett, John. 1959. The Theatre of Bertolt Brecht: A Study from Eight Aspects. London: Methuen. .

References

Plays by Bertolt Brecht
Compositions by Paul Dessau
1951 plays